Shooting at the 2011 Games of the Small States of Europe was held from 31 May – 3 June 2011.

Medal summary

Men

Women

Medal table

References
Shooting Site of the 2011 Games of the Small States of Europe

2011 in shooting sports
2011 Games of the Small States of Europe
Shooting at the Games of the Small States of Europe